Bessie Allison Buchanan (March 7, 1902 – September 7, 1980), of Manhattan in New York City, became the first African-American woman to hold a seat in the New York State Legislature when she was elected to the New York State Assembly in 1954.

Family and early life
Charles and Evelyn Allison moved to New York City from Petersburg, Virginia, around the turn of the 20th century. Their daughter Bessie was born on March 7, 1902, and grew up in New York City with her five sisters and one brother.

Singer and dancer
From a young age, Bessie Allison had an interest in singing and dance. She appeared in the original Shuffle Along in 1921, the first successful musical comedy with an all African-American cast. She was in the 1925 edition of Plantation Revue and in the integrated cast of Lucky in 1927. She performed with the Show Boat road company and recorded for Black Swan Records. Bessie also danced in the chorus line of the famed Cotton Club.

Bessie Allison met Charlie Buchanan, who was the director of the Savoy Ballroom, while she was working as a dancer and singer in Harlem. They were married in 1929 and she retired from the stage.

Harlem socialite
After her marriage, Bessie was active in Woman's Civic Club activities in Harlem. She frequented the popular night clubs. Jet magazine and other publication wrote about her social comings and goings. It has been alleged that she had a lesbian relationship with dancer and entertainer Josephine Baker.

1951 Stork Club incident
Buchanan was in Josephine Baker's party at the Stork Club in 1951 when Baker became dissatisfied with her service and stormed out of the nightclub. Baker claimed she had been treated in a racist way and a public debate occurred in the media, with high-profile celebrities taking sides. Baker and Buchanan organized protests and a picket line to pressure the Stork Club's clientele to boycott the club.

Political career
Buchanan became interested in politics while she was campaigning for Governor Herbert H. Lehman's election to the United States Senate in 1949. After Lehman was elected, she stayed involved with community and political organizations in Harlem. In 1954 she was approached about running as the Democratic Party candidate for the New York State Assembly from Harlem's 12th district. In the general election, Buchanan won easily over her opponent Lucille Pickett, another black woman, 22,401 to 6,177 votes in a district heavily dominated by Democrats. Buchanan was reelected three more times and served a total of eight years. She was the first black woman elected to the New York State Legislature.

New York State Assemblywoman
Buchanan was a member of the New York State Assembly (New York Co., 12th district) from 1955 to 1962, sitting in the 170th, 171st, 172nd and 173rd New York State Legislatures. While in the legislature, she served on the Cities, Institutions, Printing, and Social Welfare committees. She was assigned to the Joint Legislative Committee on the Problems of the Aging.

In 1960 Buchanan was selected by Governor Nelson Rockefeller as a delegate to the White House Conference on the Aged. In 1962, Buchanan did not run for reelection. Instead she crossed party lines and supported Republicans Governor Rockefeller and Senator Jacob Javits in their reelection bids.

Commissioner of the Human Rights Division
On April 30, 1963, Gov. Rockefeller appointed Buchanan as New York State Commissioner of Human Rights. She remained in office for five years.

Later life, death, and legacy
Buchanan remained active in community activities after she left public office. She died in 1980 at the age of 78 after a short illness.

References

Further reading
 Paterson, David (2020). Black, Blind, & in Charge: A Story of Visionary Leadership and Overcoming Adversity. New York: Skyhorse Publishing.
 Clayton-Powell, Adam Jr. Adam by Adam: The Autobiography of Adam Clayton Powell Jr. New York, 1972
 Davis, Benjamin. Communist Councilman from Harlem: Autobiographical Notes Written in a Federal Penitentiary New York, New York 1969
 Dinkins, David A Mayor's Life: Governing New York's Gorgeous Mosaic, PublicAffairs Books, 2013
 Howell, Ron. Boss of Black Brooklyn: The Life and Times of Bertram L. Baker Fordham University Press Bronx, New York 2018
 Jack, Hulan. Fifty Years a Democrat: The Autobiography of Hulan Jack. New Benjamin Franklin House New York, NY 1983
 Baker Motley, Constance. Equal Justice Under The Law: An Autobiography, New York: Farrar, Straus, and Giroux, 1998.
 Pritchett, Wendell E. Robert Clifton Weaver and the American City: The Life and Times of an Urban Reformer, Chicago: University of Chicago Press 2008
 Rangel, Charles B.; Wynter, Leon (2007) And I Haven't Had a Bad Day Since: From the Streets of Harlem to the Halls of Congress. New York: St. Martin's Press. 
 Walker, John C. The Harlem Fox: J. Raymond Jones at Tammany 1920–1970, New York: State University New York Press, 1989.

External links
 "New York Firsts in Black History". 
Photograph of Buchanan captioned: "Assemblywoman Bessie A. Buchanan was the first black woman elected to the assembly in Albany in 1955"], New York Daily News

1902 births
1980 deaths
African-American state legislators in New York (state)
20th-century African-American women singers
Democratic Party members of the New York State Assembly
Women state legislators in New York (state)
Politicians from Petersburg, Virginia
People from Harlem
20th-century American politicians
20th-century American women politicians